The Goya Award for Best Director (Spanish: Premio Goya a la mejor dirección) is one of the Goya Awards, Spain's principal national film awards. The category has been presented ever since the first edition of the Goya Awards. Fernando Fernán Gómez was the first winner of this award for his film Voyage to Nowhere. 

Pedro Almodóvar holds the record of most wins and nominations for this category, with three wins out of eleven nominations, winning for All About My Mother (1999), Volver (2006) and Pain and Glory (2019). Fernando León de Aranoa shares the record of most wins, having won three times out of four nominations, winning for Barrio (1998), Mondays in the Sun (2002) and The Good Boss (2021). Directors Fernando Trueba, Alejandro Amenábar, Isabel Coixet, J. A. Bayona and Rodrigo Sorogoyen have received this award twice.

In the list below the winner of the award for each year is shown first, followed by the other nominees.

Winners and nominees

1980s

1990s

2000s

2010s

2020s

Multiple nominations
The following 35 directors have received multiple Best Director nominations.

References

External links
Official site
IMDb: Goya Awards

Director
Awards for best director